Likoni is among the six constituencies in Mombasa County with five wards which include Timbwani which is the largest, Bofu, Mtongwe, Likoni and Shika Adabu.

The current Member of Parliament for Likoni is Hon Mishi Juma Mboko   who is a member of the Orange Democratic Movement party and took over from Mwalim Masoud Mwahima in 2017 who ran on a jubilee ticket.

Inspire of many cases of insecurity in the constituency, the member of Parliament is working with the national government to make likoni a safe place for the Likonians

Members of Parliament

Locations and wards

References

External links 
Map of the constituency

Constituencies in Mombasa County
Constituencies in Coast Province